Sovereign Harbour is a development of the beachland in the seaside resort of Eastbourne, to the east of the town centre. Opened in 1993 and formerly known as The Crumbles, the marina now consists of five separate harbours, (North Harbour, South Harbour, West Harbour, Outer Harbour and Inner Harbour), a retail park and several housing projects with both permanent and holiday properties. Sovereign Harbour is Northern Europe’s largest composite marina complex.

The marina was originally run by its developer, Carillion, until 2007 when it was bought by the Premier Marinas group, who also run several other marinas along the South Coast including Brighton, Chichester and Port Solent.

The Harbours

The tidal Outer Harbour is only used for entrance to the marina through twin sea locks, which are operated 24 hours a day.  It needs frequent dredging to keep the access channel from the sea to the locks open and deep enough for vessels. The local RNLI lifeboat has its own mooring there. The entrance is beside Martello Tower No.66.

All the harbours (Inner, South, West and North) are artificial and were dredged one after the other, after 1991. Behind the locks is the main marina called Inner Harbour.  This is the central body of water and was the first harbour in use.  It contains berths for both visiting and resident berth holders, as well as provides access to the other three harbours via lifting bridges.  The other three are used mostly by resident berth holders as well as the local fishing vessels.

The North Harbour is the latest development, and this body of water is larger than the initial Inner Harbour. The two remaining harbours West and South are much smaller and in use by local residents owning a house/apartment around these waters.

A large boat lift now uses a corner in the North Harbour, near the local chandlery and winter storage for yachts. The locks - for access to and from the sea - and all lifting bridges are operated from the Harbour office building located next to the locks.  The office is staffed around the clock - all days of the year. The keep listening watch is on VHF channel 17 (and not channel 80 as most marinas in the UK). Directly adjacent to the locks (and the office) is a fuel pontoon where self-service pumps for diesel and petrol are found.  There is also an amenities building which provides toilets, showers and laundry facilities to visiting and resident berth holders. Visiting yachts normally contact the harbour master via VHF before arrival to obtain information about tides, depths of the dredged channel and other relevant information.

Residential properties are about evenly split between the North and South harbours, with the Waterfront (restaurants, bars, and shops) laying between them.

In the last decade of the 20th century Sovereign Harbour was clearly a project in progress, but now it is more-or-less a completed project: the local yacht club 'Sovereign Harbour Yacht Club', has a permanent building, there is a 'waterfront' with shops and restaurants and most large-scale building activities are completed. During the earlier years the marina was more a building site then a leisure location.

Housing 

The housing developments in the marina contain a variety of different style houses and apartments both waterside and non-waterside. Many properties include a private mooring in one of the harbours and some provide private and direct access from the property to a private jetty.
Development began around the South Harbour and West Harbour but later extended to the land around the North Harbour and the small stretch of land between the Inner Harbour and the sea. There are now over 3,500 homes in the harbour. Most residents of the Harbour, pay an annual fee to the 'Sovereign Harbour Trust' for maintenance to the harbour, bridges, locks, cleaning the water ways and dredging the channel so boats can get in and out of the harbour, it also helps pay for coastal defences as well.

Commercial 

At the western shore of the Inner Harbour there is the -so called- Waterfront with restaurants (including Harvester), coffee-shops, estate agents, chandlery etc. Directly behind this waterfront the large sheds are located for winter storage for yachts, boat repair shops etc.

There is also a commercial park directly behind the project with an ASDA supermarket, Next, Boots & Matalan stores, and others. All these large scale shops are built around a huge car-park. Although officially not part of the development, it offers visitors and residents much desired shopping options. Especially for visiting yachtsmen (without proper transport) these superstores are handy as Eastbourne town centre is a few miles away. Beside the commercial park, Innovation Park is being developed with various office buildings, including 'Pacific House'. It is beside the Harbour Medical Practice, open since 2011.

Frequent bus services connect the harbour development with the centre of Eastbourne and the Seafront.

Lifeboat

The marina is also the location of the Eastbourne Lifeboat. The Tamar class all-weather lifeboat, namely The Diamond Jubilee 16-23' is normally anchored in the outer-harbour but can occasionally be seen moored in one of the locks during particularly bad weather conditions. In this case, locking procedures make sure that the lifeboat can still launch at very short notice when called-out.

Seals
The harbour has also attracted several wildlife visitors including four grey seals. Once in 2013, before it went to Eastbourne and then Seaford. Another injured seal arrived in 2015.

References

External links 
 Premier Marinas, operator of the marina
 SH Berth Holders Association
 SH Residents Association
 Eastbourne RNLI
 Licensed Nautical Charts of Sovereign Harbour and approach

Eastbourne
Marinas in England
Tourist attractions in East Sussex